St. John's College is a constituent college of Dr. Bhimrao Ambedkar University, located in Agra. It is a Christian college under the Church of North India. It was established by the Church Mission Society to Agra. The college admits both undergraduates and postgraduates and awards degrees in liberal arts, commerce, sciences, business administration and education under the purview of Agra University.

The college was built in honor of John the Apostle, one of the Twelve apostles of Jesus.

History 
St. John's College, Agra, was established in 1850 by the Church Missionary Society (CMS) of England, along with Agra C.M.S. Association, and its first principal was Rev. Thomas Valpy French (1825–1891), a fellow of University College, Oxford. In 1869–70, it had 297 students, out of which 199 were Hindus, 76 Muslims, and 22 Christians.

From 1862 to 1888, the college was affiliated to the University of Calcutta. In 1912 the Church Missionary Society opened a sister school for girls in Agra and Ethel McNeile was the founding head of school. She had persuaded the CMS and the Zenana Bible and Medical Missionary Society that schools for girls in India should aspire to rival British public schools.

In 1927, St John's school that by then affiliated to the University of Allahabad moved to affiliate with Agra University (now known as Dr. Bhim Rao Ambedkar University) as it came into existence, the college became affiliated to it, and its principal Dr. A.W. Davies became the first Vice-Chancellor of the newly formed University. Since 1893, the college has offered post-graduate courses.

The college celebrated its centenary in 1952; on this occasion a new wing of the college was built. The foundation stone of the Centenary Wing was laid by Bharat Ratna Sarvapalli Radhakrishnan, former president of India in 1957 and was inaugurated by the prime m
inister, Jawahar Lal Nehru, on 9 October 1959.

Presently the principal of the college is Dr. Shailendra Pratap Singh.

Present composition 
St. John's College is a co-educational institution of higher learning with a men-women ratio of 45:55. It is regarded as a good college of Northern India. The college offers courses under five faculties – three in regular and two in self-finance mode. The college has sixteen post-graduate departments with facilities for research and three under-graduate departments. The college also runs five self-financed recognized courses: the B.Com. (vocational), B.B.A., B.Ed., M.A. (Urdu), postgraduate diploma in clinical psychology and two partially self-financed degree programmes in B.Sc. with industrial chemistry, and B.Sc. with computer science.

The college has always striven to admit students and select teachers from all communities and from all parts of India. It also admits a small number of students from overseas. The college offers scholarships and awards to meritorious students. These are endowed over a period of time.

Campus 
The college is situated on a large and well-known campus in Agra; on the occasion of its centenary, a new wing of the college was built. The foundation stone of the Centenary Wing was laid by Bharat Ratna Sarvapalli Radhakrishnan, former president of India, in 1957 and was inaugurated by the prime minister, Jawahar Lal Nehru, on 9 October 1959. Facilities for a number of sports are provided for on college campus. The annexe, the ladies common room, provide facilities for indoor sport and recreation. The chapel of invitation is open to all members for worship and meditation.

Residence halls

The college's halls of residence are spread across two blocks, named for former principals, as given below:
 Davis house
 Bishop French hostel

Library 
The St. John's college has a central library with over 90,000 books, a reading room open access and a reference section for post-graduate and research student, most of the departments have departmental library for post-graduate students.

The college library also provides INFLIBNET facility to the faculty members, research scholars and post graduate students to consult more than 80,000 e-journals and e-books.

Admission 
The college has its own selection process. the college has an online application process( https://sjcportal.in ) where prospective applicants are expected to fill in their interests and academic achievements. the colleges releases a list for students selected to an interview.

Academics
St. John's offers undergraduate and postgraduate degrees in:
English
History
Political science
Economics
Psychology
Geography
Hindi
Sanskrit
Urdu
Business administration
Accounts and law
Business economics
Physics
Chemistry
Mathematics
Statistics
Zoology
Botany.
Education 
Computer science

St. John's offers one Ph.D. in science and commerce. Students can take vocational courses in foreign trade, advertising and sales promotion, insurance, computer science, demography, yoga psychology and mental health and communicative English.  The college runs a study centre of Indira Gandhi National Open University.

Student societies 
Students club and societies engage in activities concerned with debating, dramatics, photography, social services, quizzing, 'dumcherade', 'antakshri' etc. many societies i.e.; BOTSO, CHEMSO, regularly invite distinguished visitors to address and join issue with students on various topical issues.

The various societies in colleges are:-
 Rovers And Rangers
 Botanical Society (BOTSO)
 Chemical Society (CHEMSO)
 Student Christian Movement Of India (SCM)
 National Service Scheme (NSS)
 National Cadet Corps Army Wing 
 National Cadet Corps Air Force Wing 
 Commerce Association 
 Alumni Cell
 Cultural Society
 Hindi Sabha
 Arts Association
 Science Association
 Zoology Association

Principals

Rev. Thomas Valpy French, D.D. (first principal 1850–1859)
 Scholar and Fellow of University College, Oxford. 
 First bishop of Lahore, United India. (1877–1887) 
 Rev. Henry William Shackell, M.A. (1859–1861)
 Student and Fellow of Pembroke College, Cambridge. 
 Rev. John Barton, M.A. (1861–1863)
 Student of Christ's College, Cambridge.
 First principal, Cathedral Mission College, Calcutta. (1865)
 Fellow of Madras University, Madras. (1871)
 Vicar of Holy Trinity, Cambridge. (1876–1893)
 Rev. Charles Ellard Vines, M.A. (1863–1878)
 Student of Trinity College, Cambridge.
 Honours in mathematics, Trinity College, Cambridge. (1862)
 Rev. James Abbott Lloyd, M.A. (1878–1880)
 Student of St. John's College, Cambridge. 
 Vice principal, St. John's College, Agra. (1877–1878)
 Vicar of St. Giles's, Norwich. (1893)
 Rev. Robert John Bell, M.R.C.P (1880–1883)
 Professor at Cathedral Mission College, Calcutta. (1874–1880)
 Rev. George Edger Augustus Pargiter, M.A. (1883–1890)
 Student of Merton College, Oxford.
 Fellow of Allahabad University, Allahabad. (1890)
 Vicar of St. Paul's, Leamington. (1894)
 Rev. John Parker Haythornthwaite, M.A. (1890–1911)
 Student of St. John's College, Cambridge. 
 Fellow of Allahabad University, Allahabad. (1894)
 Vicar of King's Langley. (1916)
 Rev. Harry Bickersteth Durrant, M.A. (1911–1913)
 Scholar and exhibitioner of Pembroke College, Cambridge.
 Fellow of Allahabad University, Allahabad. (1901)
 Vice principal, St. John's College, Agra. (1905)
 Canon of Lucknow. (1912)
 Bishop of Lahore, United India. (1913)
 Fellow of Punjab University. (1913)

 Rev. Dr. Arthur Whitcliffe Davies, M.A., D.Litt. (1913–1928)
 Scholar of Uppingham and University College, Oxford. (1902)
 Scholar of Wycliffe Hall, Oxford. (1904)
 Vice principal, St. John's College, Agra. (1911)
 Canon of Lucknow. (1917)
 Kaiser-i-Hind Medal. (1921)
 First vice chancellor of Agra University. (1927)
 Hon. Canon of Bradford. (1930)
 William Edward Sladen Holland, M.A. (1929–1933)
 Student of Magdalen College, Oxford. 
 Founded Oxford and Cambridge Hostel (now Holland Hall, Allahabad)
 Fellow of Allahabad University, Allahabad. (1906)
 Principal, St. Paul's College, Calcutta. (1913)
 Fellow of Calcutta University, Calcutta. (1916)
 Canon of Lucknow. (1931)
 Rev. Canon Thomas Donald Sully, M.A. (1933–1948)
 Scholar of Wadham College, Oxford. 
 C.V. Mahajan, B.A. (1948–1954)
 Scholar of Keble College, Oxford. 
 Dr. P. Thomas Chandi (1954–1968)
 Conferred 'Padam Shree' by the Government of India. (1965)
 Vice chancellor of Gorakhpur University. (1968)
 Dr. P.I. Ittyerah (1968–1978)
 Dr. S.C. Banwar (1978–1979)
 Pro vice chancellor of North Eastern Hill University, Shillong. (1979)
 Gladwin M. Ram, A.M. (1979–1991)
 Scholar of Harvard University, Massachusetts.
 Dr. M.S. Renick, P.hD. (1991–1996)
 Dr. Ipe Michael Ipe, P.hD. (1996–1999)
 Dr. Fazal Masih Prasad, M.Sc. (Ag. Chem)., D.Phil., D.Sc., F.B.R.S., F.I.S.A.C., F.I.S.A.B., F.I.C.C., F.S.P.P.S., M.N.A.Sc.  (1999–2011)
 Scholar of Agra and Allahabad Universities.
 Member, board of governors, Ewing Christian College, Allahabad.
 Member, board of governors, St. Andrew's College, Gorakhpur.
 Member, board of governors, Sherwood College, Nainital.
 Member, board of governors, All Saints' College, Nainital.
 Manager, St. John's Inter College, Agra.
 Fellow of Plant Protection Science.
 Fellow and Life Member of Indian Council of Chemists 
 Conferred Dr. Sam Higginbottom Award for the Best Principal for the year 2004–2005.
 Member of Board of Studies in Chemistry, Dairy Chemistry, Engineering Chemistry and Home Science. (1984–1999)
 Member of Board of Studies in Agricultural Chemistry, Mahatma Jyotiba Phule Rohilkhand University, Bareilly. 
 Member of editorial board of The New Agriculturist.
 Member of executive committee of Indian Society of Agricultural Chemists. 
 Technical editor of The Allahabad Farmer
 Conferred Rev. Fr. T.A. Mithias National Award for the Innovative College Educators for the year 2002. 
 Fellow of Indian Society of Agri-Bio Chemists. 
 Conferred The Jewel of India Award. (2001)
 Conferred Vidya Ratan Award. (2001)
 Fellow of Indian Society of Agricultural Chemists. 
 Fellow of Bioved Research Society.
 Acting principal, Allahabad Agricultural Institute. (1992–1993)
 Head of the Department of Chemistry, Allahabad Agricultural Institute. (1996–1999)
 Dean (students' welfare), Allahabad Agricultural Institute.
 Proctor, Allahabad Agricultural Institute.
  Prof. Alexender Lall (2011–2015)
 Prof. Peter Edward Joseph, D.Phil., F.I.C.C. (2015 – 30 June 2019)
 Dr. Shailendra Pratap Singh (11 July 2019 –)

Notable alumni
St. John's College Agra has produced many distinguished personalities, including one President of India, two Governor of states, one nominee for the Nobel prize, Indian ambassador to United States of America and many IAS, IFS and IRS officers. 
 Shankar Dayal Sharma, former President of India.
 Pankaj Pachauri, journalist, managing editor of NDTV
 Meera Shankar, IFS, Indian ambassador to the United States
 Babu Gulabrai, Hindi writer and philosopher
 Khurshed Alam Khan, former governor of Karnataka
 Shilendra Kumar Singh, former foreign secretary and governor of Rajasthan
 Laxmi Raman Acharya, freedom fighter and former deputy chief minister, Uttar Pradesh
 Neeraj Kapoor, Founder and Chairman Startup Business Academy, former CMO Payback (An American Express company), former Vice President Go Airways, former Brand Head LG, India.
 Rangeya Raghav (1923–1962), Hindi writer.
 Raj Narain, IRS (Retd.), former member/spl. secretary, Central Board of Direct Taxes
 Asrar ul Haq Majaz, eminent Urdu poet
 Manapurathu Verghese George, photochemist, Shanti Swarup Bhatnagar laureate
 Rakesh Asthana, former Police Commissioner of Delhi and former special director of CBI. 

Mr.Rameshwar Nath Zutshi, Editor of "The Leader" (1950s to 1964) a leading English daily Newspaper from Allahabad.

Mr. Rajeshwar Nath Zutshi, educationist, awarded Padam Shri by the Government of India, Principal of "The Daly College" at Indore (1956 - 1968) also the Mayor of Indore.

Notable presidents
 Cyril Charles (1980)
 Samuel Charles (1952)

Further reading
 St. John's College, Agra (1850–1930), by Rev. John Parker Haythornthwaite, revised and completed by Rev. T D Sully Highway), 1932.

References

 An Heroic Bishop : the life-story of French of Lahore (1913), Online- Chapter II St. John's College, Agra "French and Stuart sailed on September 11 in the East Indian Queen, which reached Calcutta after an unusually quick voyage, of course round the Cape, on January 2, 1851." page 11."The new college, named St. John's after Henry Martyn's college at Cambridge, with additional reference to St. John as the Apostle of Oriental Churches," was opened in 1853"..page 14 PDF

External links
 St. John's College, Agra website
 St. John's College, Agra, Student Alumni Network
 St. John's College, Agra at wikimapia

 

Universities and colleges in Agra
Educational institutions established in 1850
Christian universities and colleges in India
Universities and colleges affiliated with the Church of North India
1850 establishments in India